The London class is a series of six container ships built for Zodiac Maritime (4 ships) and Eastern Pacific Shipping (2 ships). The ships are charted to Mediterranean Shipping Company (MSC). The ships have a maximum theoretical capacity of 16,652 twenty-foot equivalent units (TEU). The ships were built by STX Offshore & Shipbuilding in South Korea.

List of ships

See also

References 

Container ship classes
Ships built by STX Offshore & Shipbuilding